Sandared is a locality situated in Borås Municipality, Västra Götaland County, Sweden. It had 3,160 inhabitants in 2010.

Sports
The following sports clubs are located in Sandared:

 Sandareds IF
 Sandareds IBS

References 

Populated places in Västra Götaland County
Populated places in Borås Municipality